Felly Mulumba Tshiyoyo (born 3 June 1990), known as Felly Mulumba, is a Kenyan footballer who currently plays for Bandari in the Kenyan Premier League. Born in  DR. Congo.

1987 births
Living people
Democratic Republic of the Congo footballers
Democratic Republic of the Congo expatriate footballers
Expatriate footballers in Kenya
Kenyan Premier League players
People from Kananga
Posta Rangers F.C. players
Bandari F.C. (Kenya) players
Association football defenders
21st-century Democratic Republic of the Congo people